Santísima Trinidad was the name of several Spanish ships:

 , the largest of the Manilla galleons
 , a first-rate ship of the line officially named Santísima Trinidad in 1768; launched in 1769; captured at the Battle of Trafalgar, but later sank in a storm 

Spanish Navy ship names